The Asia/Oceania Zone was one of the three zones of the regional Davis Cup competition in 2016.

In the Asia/Oceania Zone there were four different tiers, called groups, in which teams competed against each other to advance to the upper tier. Winners in Group II advanced to the Asia/Oceania Zone Group I. Teams who lost their respective ties competed in the relegation play-offs, with winning teams remaining in Group II, whereas teams who lost their play-offs were relegated to the Asia/Oceania Zone Group III in 2017.

Participating nations

Seeds:

 
 
 
 

Remaining nations:

Draw

 and  relegated to Group III in 2017.
 promoted to Group I in 2017.

First round

Chinese Taipei vs. Malaysia

Philippines vs. Kuwait

Indonesia vs. Vietnam

Thailand vs. Sri Lanka

Second round

Philippines vs. Chinese Taipei

Thailand vs. Vietnam

Play-offs

Kuwait vs. Malaysia

Indonesia vs. Sri Lanka

Third round

Chinese Taipei vs. Thailand

References

External links
Official Website

Asia Oceania Zone Group II
Davis Cup Asia/Oceania Zone